The perimeter is the distance around a given two-dimensional object.

Perimeter  may also refer to:

 Perimeter Aviation, an airline
 Perimeter fence, the demarcation of a perimeter, when the protection of assets, personnel or buildings is required
 Perimeter Institute for Theoretical Physics, an independent research centre in foundational theoretical physics

Places
 Interstate 285 (Georgia) ("The Perimeter"), an Interstate Highway loop encircling Atlanta, Georgia
 Perimeter Center, a major edge city in metro Atlanta, Georgia, United States
 Perimeter Mall, an upscale shopping mall in Dunwoody, Georgia

Technology
 Dead Hand (also ), a Cold War-era automatic nuclear weapons-control system used by the Soviet Union
 Perimeter (video game), a real-time strategy video game developed by Russian studio K-D Lab for Microsoft Windows
 Visual field test (also perimeter), an eye examination that can detect dysfunction in central and peripheral vision

See also
 Perimeter Highway (disambiguation)